Gary Ware (born September 1, 1983) is an American professional basketball player for Jennersdorf Blackbirds of the Basketball Zweite Liga.

He played for Raiffeisen Panthers from 2014 to 2016. Ware played for the Mattersburg Rocks of the Basketball Zweite Liga from 2018 to 2021. During the 2020-21 season, he averaged a league-leading 19.9 points per game as well as 8.2 rebounds and 1.6 assists per game. On September 30, 2021, Ware signed with Jennersdorf Blackbirds.

References

External links

1983 births
Living people
American expatriate basketball people in France
American expatriate basketball people in North Macedonia
BSC Fürstenfeld Panthers players
Centers (basketball)
Power forwards (basketball)
Basketball players from Detroit
American men's basketball players